A not-for-profit arts organization, also known as a nonprofit arts organization, usually takes the form of a not-for-profit organization, association, or foundation. Such organizations are formed for the purpose of developing and promoting the work of artists in various visual and performing art forms such as film, sculpture, dance, painting, multimedia, poetry, and performance art.

History
Although museums and performing arts societies have existed for centuries, they have proliferated since the end of World War II. In particular, government sponsored organisations such as the Arts Council of Great Britain, the Canada Council, the New York State Council on the Arts and the National Endowment for the Arts, have been created to fund award grants to help promote the development of art and culture.

There are also not-for-profit legal service organizations providing services to artists and arts and cultural organizations. Philadelphia Volunteer Lawyers for the Arts (PVLA) is one such organization. Through its volunteer attorneys PVLA provides non-criminal legal assistance to artists and arts and cultural organizations on arts related issues.

Canadian artist-run centres
In Canada, a series of artist-run organizations often known as "parallel galleries" or artist-run centres (ARCs) have developed in cities across the country since the 1960s to encourage the exhibition of contemporary works by Canadian and international artists. The purpose is often to provide alternative spaces for exhibition for emerging artists and contemporary artists outside the commercial gallery system. Canadian ARCs usually pay a fee and de-emphasize the selling of work, although this will vary from gallery to gallery. A recommended schedule of payment is provided by the Canadian Artists' Representation (CARFAC), an artists' advocacy group.

See also 
 Association without lucrative purpose
 Artist-run initiative
 Artist-run space
 Artist cooperative
 Arts centre
 Canadian artist-run centres
 Community arts

References 

Arts organizations
 Artist-run initiative
Types of art museums and galleries